Charley's Uncle is a 1969 West German comedy film directed by Werner Jacobs and starring Gila von Weitershausen, Karl Michael Vogler and Heidy Bohlen. The film was a loose adaptation of Brandon Thomas' 1892 play Charley's Aunt and depicts the bond between a young woman and her uncle.

Main cast
Gila von Weitershausen as Carla Werner
Karl Michael Vogler as  Boy Deisen
Gustav Knuth as Kapitän Johann Tressplake
Erna Sellmer as Cornelia Tressplake
Gunther Philipp as Dr. Alfred Krusius
Hubert von Meyerinck as Fahrschulbesitzer
Heidy Bohlen as Lilo Freddersen
Heinz Erhardt as Vertreter
Willy Millowitsch as Herr Rüttersbusch
Ralf Wolter as Polizist
Edith Hancke as Helga
Rudolf Schündler as Dr. Brunn
Loni Heuser as Frau Müggel
Achim Strietzel as Sonny
Andrea Rau as Dottie
Karl Dall as Kneipenmusiker
Karel Gott

References

Bibliography
Hans-Michael Bock and Tim Bergfelder. The Concise Cinegraph: An Encyclopedia of German Cinema. Berghahn Books, 2009.

External links

1969 films
West German films
Films directed by Werner Jacobs
German comedy films
1969 comedy films
Constantin Film films
1960s German films